K. Bhaskaran Nair (1 March 1929 – 29 March 1990), known by his stage name Adoor Bhasi, was an Indian actor and film director from Kerala. Adoor Bhasi was almost always cast as the man who stands next to the hero. His hilarious actions and roles became the cynosure of comic scenes in the Malayalam films of the 1950s, 1960s, 1970s and 1980s, especially with Ever Green Hero of Malayalam Cinema, Shri Prem Nazir. He is also famous for his eloquent speeches in fluent English. He directed three Malayalam films during the late 1970s.

Early life

Adoor Bhasi was born on 1 March 1929 in Peringanadu, Adoor, Travancore, with a rich lineage to boast of. His father, E. V. Krishna Pillai, was a renowned Malayalam humourist writer, dramatist, pioneering short story writer and essayist, a lawyer and a Member of the then Travancore Legislative Assembly (M.L.C.). His mother, Maheshwari Amma, was the youngest daughter of C. V. Raman Pillai, one among the greatest Malayalam novelists, being the first historical novelist in Malayalam and author of Marthanda Varma, Dharmaraja, Premamritham, and Ramarajabahadur, pioneering dramatist, journalist and social activist.

Bhasi was the fourth of the seven children of his parents. His siblings (two sisters and four brothers) were (all late) K. Omana Amma, K. Ramachandran Nair alias Chandraji, Rajalakshmi Amma, K. Padmanabhan Nair, Sankaran Nair, who died young at the age of 18, and K. Krishnan Nair.

His elder brother Chandraji became a film actor much before him. Chandraji entered the Film world of Bollywood and acted in a few Hindi films (Bimal Roy's Parineeta and Hrishikesh Mukherji's films) before moving over with his family to Madras to live with Adoor Bhasi. Chandraji was the manager of RK Studios owned by Raj Kapoor in Mumbai and has acted as villain in the popular Bollywood film Ashique alongside Raj Kapoor. Chandraji then acted in several Malayalam films like Chithram and became well known as an actor. His nephew, B. Harikumar, is a well-known novelist, satirist and actor in Malayalam and has acted in several TV serials and feature films.

Bhasi spent his childhood along with his parents in Trivandrum. He had his primary education in a missionary school—Vadakkekottaaram—in the capital city. After his father's premature death at the age of 44, Bhasi, along with his mother and siblings moved to his father's native village of Adoor and had his middle and high school studies in the English High School of Adoor. After his school education, he moved over to Trivandrum and lived with his maternal aunt. He then joined the Institute of Textile Technology and passed the professional course of diploma in Textile Chemistry. He did not attend any college for graduation. After acquiring the diploma, he was to do internship in a textile mill in Coimbatore in Tamil Nadu, but owing to financial difficulties, he could not pursue the prescribed internship. He then worked as an apprentice in the Lakshmi Textiles factory in Trivandrum, but could not secure a job in any textile mill in Travancore. He stayed put in Trivandrum and while staying with his eldest maternal aunt, B. Gourikutty Amma, for more than 12 years in Rosscote Bungalow, the house built by his maternal grandfather, C. V. Raman Pillai, began acting on the amateur stage and taking part in dramas broadcast by All India Radio, Thiruvananthapuram station, along with leading stage actors of the time, like C. I. Parameswaran Pillai, Kainikkara Kumara Pillai, P. K. Vikraman Nair, T. R. Sukumaran Nair, Jagathy N. K. Achary, Nagavally R. S. Kurup, Thikkurissy Sukumaran Nair, P. K. Veeraraghavan Nair alias Veeran, T. N. Gopinathan Nair, Aranmula Ponnamma, Mavelikara Ponnamma, and Pattom Saraswathi Amma.

During those twelve years, he also worked as the Manager of P. K. Memorial Press run by the well-known playwright, T. N. Gopinathan Nair, and also worked as the Manager of Sakhi weekly, edited by T. N. Gopinathan Nair, Rosscote Krishna Pillai and Kavalam Narayana Panicker. His friendship with T. N. earned for him many close contacts with writers and artistes in the professional world of Malayalam drama and films. That ultimately secured for him entry into the amateur stage and finally to the Malayalam film world.

Career
Bhasi got his first chance in a small role in a Malayalam feature film, Thiramala, directed by P. R. S. Pillai. His first notable film was Chandrathara's Mudiyanaya Puthran (1961). In the year 1968, he acted in Viruthan Shanku, the first full-length comedy in Malayalam cinema by P. Venu.  He went on to become one of the highly sought-after and inalienable actors and celebrities of Malayalam feature films of the 1960s and 1970s. He, along with S. P. Pillai and Bahadur formed the trio that contributed to rollicking comedy scenes in Malayalam films. Bhasi went on to act in over 700 films, mainly in supporting roles. He acted with almost all leading actors in Malayalam in his period, like Sathyan, Prem Nazir, Madhu, K. P. Ummer, Jayan, M. G. Soman, Sukumaran, Mammootty and Mohanlal.

He acted as the villain in Karimbana and Itha Oru Manushyan. He did double roles in Kottaram Vilkkanundu, Bhadradeepam  and Lankadahanam. He got his first Kerala State Film Award for best actor in 1974 for Chattakkari. He first acted as hero in John Abraham's Cheriyachante Kroorakrithyangal (1978) and got the Kerala State Film Award for best actor in 1979. Later in 1984, he won the Kerala State Film Award for best actor for his performance in 18 April (1983). A memorial to Adoor Bhasi is being built by the District Panchayat of Pathanamthitta, the foundation stone for which was laid on 12 June 2009.

A film based on Bhasi's real-life is in the making with Dileep playing the lead role. It is based on a novel by B. Harikumar (his nephew) called Mareecham. The script work is by Harikumar himself and the film is produced and directed by Suku Menon. The location is planned out of Trivandrum and Adoor.

Adoor Bhasi is often considered one of the first film makers in South India to recognize the credentials of Kamal Haasan when he cast him as lead in his movie Adiyapadam, Kamal later became one of the greatest stars India has ever produced.

Controversies
Adoor Bhasi was accused by several artistes including K. P. A. C. Lalitha and director P. Chandrakumar of being a villain in real life as well as drunk and a sadist after his death.

Death

Bhasi suffered from various health problems like diabetes and hypertension during his last years. He also suffered from kidney disease. Being a lifelong bachelor, he did not have any family support. The death of his co-star Prem Nazir in January 1989 shattered him very much. Nazir was not only Bhasi's co-star in many films, but was also a childhood friend. Finally, he died on 29 March 1990, aged 61. His death occurred on the eve of his father's 52nd death anniversary. He was cremated with full state honours at his home in Adoor.

Awards
Kerala State Film Awards:

1974: Best Actor – Chattakkari (directed by K. S. Sethumadhavan)
1979: Best Actor – Cheriyachante Kroorakrithyangal (directed by John Abraham)
1984: Second Best Actor – 18 April (directed by Balachandra Menon)

Filmfare Awards South:

1976: Best Actor – Raagam

Filmography

As actor 
Note: The list may be incomplete

 Thiramaala (1953)
 Mudiyanaaya Puthran (1961) as Krishnan Nair
 Jnaanasundari (1961) as Michael
 Viyarpintae Vila (1962)
 Velu Thampi Dalava (1962)
 Bhagyajathakam (1962)
 Sathyabhama (1963)
 Ninamaninja Kaalpaadukal (1963) as Subramaniyam Potti
 Moodupaddam (1963)
 Chilamboli (1963)
 Ammaye Kaanaan (1963) as Sangameshwara Iyer
 Thacholi Othenan (1964) as Vanan Ambu
 School Master (1964) as Appunni Nair
 Orral Koodi Kallanaayi (1964) as Panikkar
 Kutti Kuppayam (1964) as Chekunju
 Kudumbini (1964) as Kelu Nair
 Karutha Kai (1964) as Soman
 Kalanju Kittiya Thankam (1964) as K.P.Nair
 Devaalayam (1964)
 Bharthavu (1964)
 Bhargavi Nilayam (1964) as Cheriya Pareekanni
 Atom Bomb (1964) as Paachu
 Althaara (1964)
 Aadhiya Kiranangal (1964) as Krishnan Ashan
 Thommante Makkal (1965)
 Thankakudam (1965)
 Shyamalachechi (1965)
 Shakuntala (1965)
 Sarpakadu (1965)
 Rajamalli (1965)
 Porter Kunjali (1965) as Aboobakkar Mullakka
 Pattuthoovaala (1965) as Dr. Gregory 
 Odayil Ninnu (1965) as Velu
 Muthalali (1965)
 Murappennu (1965) as Shanku
 Mayavi (1965) as Bhasi
 Kochumon (1965)
 Kavya Mela (1965) as Vikraman
 Kattu Thulasi (1965)
 Kattu Pookkal (1965) as Pankan
 Kathirunna Nikah (1965)
 Kalyana Photo (1965)
 Kadathukaran (1965) as Kala Velu
 Jeevithayaathra (1965) as Madhavan
 Inapravugal (1965)
 Devatha (1965)
 Chettathi (1965) as Bhargavan
 Bhoomiyile Malakha (1965) as Pothen
 Ammu (1965)
 Tilottama (1966)
 Tharavatamma (1966) as Paramu Kuruppu
 Sthanarthi Saramma (1966) as Sasthrikal
 Station Master (1966)
 Rowdy (1966)
 Priyathama (1966)
 Poocha Kanni (1966)
 Pinchu Hridhayam (1966)
 Pakalkkinavu (1966)
 Mayor Nair (1966)
 Kusruthy Kuttan (1966)
 Kunjali Marakkar (1966)
 Koottukar (1966)
Kayamkulam Kochunni (1966) as Ochira Pachupilla
 Karuna (1966)
 Anarkali (1966) as Karim
 Kanmanikal (1966)
 Kanaka Chilanga (1966)
 Kalyana Rathriyil (1966)
 Kallipennu (1966)
 Kalithozhan (1966)
 Jail (1966)
 Iruttinte Athmavu (1966) as Guru Kunjichaathu
 Archana (1966) as Bhasi
 Udhyogastha (1967)
 Swapna Bhoomi (1967)
 Sahadharmini (1967)
 Ramanan (1967)... Poojari
 Post Man (1967)
 Pavappettaval (1967) as Manager
 Collector Malathy (1967) as Kittunni 
 Pareeksha (1967) as Ayappan Pilla
 N.G.O (1967)
 Nagarame Nandi (1967)
 Naadan Pennu (1967)
 Mainatharuvi Kola Case (1967)
 Madatharuvi (1967)
 Kudumbam (1967)
 Kottayam Kola Case (1967)
 Kavalaam Chundan (1967)
 Kasavuthattam (1967) as Khader
 Kaanatha Veshangal (1967)
 Jeevikkan Anuvadhikuka (1967)
 Cochin Express (1967)
 Chitra Mela (1967) as (segment "Penninte Prapancham")
 Bhagya Mudra (1967)
 Awal (1967)
 Ashwamedham (1967) as Manthravadi
 Anveshichu Kandethiyilla (1967)
 Agniputhri (1967) as Parvathidas
 Yakshi (1968) as Ananthan
 Viruthan Shanku (1968)
 Velutha Kathreena (1968) as Kuriachan
 Vazhi Pizhacha Santhathy (1968)
 Thulabharam (1968) as Achuthan Nair
 Thirichadi (1968)
 Punnapra Vayalar (1968) as Gopalji
 Padunna Puzha (1968) as Pachu Pilla, Dakshyayani,Mother(triple role)
 Midumidukki (1968)
 Manaswini (1968)
 Love in Kerala (1968) as Kunjunni
 Laksha Prabhu (1968)
 Kodungalluramma (1968)
 Viruthan Shanku (1968) as Vikraman/Shanku
 Kayal Karayil (1968)
 Kattu Kurangu (1968)
 Karthika (1968) as Mathai
 Kaliyalla Kalyanam (1968)
 Inspector (1968)
 Dial 2244 (1968)
 Bharyamar Sookshikkuka (1968) as S R Poduval
 Asuravithu (1968)
 Aparadhini (1968)
 Anchu Sundariakal (1968)
 Agni Pareeksha (1968) as Unni
 Virunnukari (1969) as Swami
 Vila Kuranja Manushyan (1969)
 Vilakkapetta Bandhangal (1969)
 Veettu Mrugam (1969)
 Susie (1969)
 Sandhya (1969)
 Rest House (1969) as K. R. Das, Beetle (double role)
 Rahasyam (1969) as Sankaran
 Padicha Kallan (1969)
 Nadhi (1969) as Lazer
 Mr. Kerala (1969)
 Mooladhanam (1969) as Kuruppu
 Kootu Kudumbam (1969)
 Kannoor Deluxe (1969) as Chandu Nair
 Kadalpalam (1969) as Nanukuttan Nair
 Jwala (1969) as Menon
 Kallichellamma(1969) as Kesheva Pilla
 Danger Biscuit (1969) as Swami
 Anaachadanam (1969)
 Adimakal (1969) as Giridhara Yogi/Naanu Kurup
 Aalmaram (1969)
 Vivahitha (1970) as Ramayya
 Vivaham Swargathil (1970)
 Mindapennu  (1970) as Das
 Vazhve Mayam (1970) as Achuthan Nair
 Triveni (1970) as Purushu
 Thara (1970) as Velu Pilla
 Stree (1970)
 Saraswathi (1970)
 Rakthapushpam (1970)
 Priya (1970)
 Pearl View (1970) as Henry
 Palunku Pathram (1970)
 Othenente Makan (1970) as Naduvazhi
 Moodalmanju (1970) as Lonappan
 Lottery Ticket (1970) as Lottery Menon/Bhaskara Menon
 Kuttavali (1970) as Kesavan
 Kurukshetram (1970)
 Kalpana (1970)
 Kakka Thamburatti (1970)
 Ezhuthatha Katha (1970)
 Dathuputhran (1970) as Jose's father
 Cross Belt (1970) as Sahasram Iyyer
 Bhikara Nimishankal (1970) as Ranger James
 Aranazhikaneram (1970) as Sivarama Kurup
 Anadha (1970)
 Amma Enna Stree (1970)
 Ambalaprav (1970)
 Nilakkatha Chalanangal (1970)
 Aa Chithrasalabham Parannotte (1970)
 Vithukal (1971) as Eravan Nair
 Vilakkuvangiya Veena (1971) as S. R. Menon
 Vidhyarthigale Ithile Ithile (1971)
 Ummachu (1971)
 Shiksha (1971) as Krishna Pilla
 Oru Penninte Katha (1971)
Makane Ninakku Vendi (1971) as Kruvilla
 Neethi (1971)
 Moonupukkal (1971)
 Marunnattil Oru Malayali (1971) as Narasimham
 Line Bus (1971) as Koodan Govinda Pilla
 Lanka Dahanam (1971) as Kondotti Moosathu, Mathai
 Karakanakadal (1971)
 Sarasayya (1971) as Poulose
 Inquilab Zindabad (1971)
 Anubhavangal Paalichakal (1971) as Rajappan
 C.I.D. Nazir (1971) as Bhasi
 Achante Bharya (1971) as Karunakaran Nair
 Aabhijathyam (1971) as Chandi
 Theertha Yathra (1972)
 Taxi Car (1972) as Nambiar, Bhasi (double role)
 Snehadeepame Mizhi Thurakku (1972)
 Sambhavami Yuge Yuge (1972) as Velu
 Sakthi (1972)
 Saathi (1972)
 Puthra Kamekhi (1972)
 Pushpanjali (1972) as Pachupilla
 Punarjanmam (1972)
 Postmane Kananilla (1972) as Hidumban
 Oru Sundariyude Katha (1972) as Unthuvandi Krishnankutty
 Omana (1972) as Cheriyachan
 Nirthasala (1972) as Paachu
 Nadan Premam (1972)
 Miss Mary (1972) as Sankaran
 Mayiladum Kunnu (1972)
 Maya (1972) as Raghuraman
 Maravil Thirivu Sookshikkuka (1972)... Kaduva Kurien
 Maram (1972)
 Manushya Bandhangal (1972)
 Manthrakodi (1972)
 Kandavarundo (1972)
 Kalippava (1972)
 Ini Oru Janmam Tharu (1972)
 Gandharavakshetram (1972) as Thekkedam Thirumeni
 Devi (1972)
 Chembarathi (1972) as Bhasi
 Brahmachari (1972)
 Azhimukham (1972)
 Aromalunni (1972)
 Anveshanam (1972)
 Ananthasayanam (1972)
 Achanum Bappayum (1972) as Madhavan
 Aaradi Manninte Janmi (1972) as Philippose
 Veendum Prabatham (1973)
 Urvashi Bharathi (1973)
 Udhayam (1973) as Ready Krishna Pilla
 Thottavadi (1973) as Dr. Pushpangadathan
 Thiruvabharanam (1973)
 Thenaruvi (1973)
 Thekkan Kattu (1973) as Gopalan
 Thaniniram (1973) as Viswambharan
 Soundarya Pooja (1973)
 Sasthram Jayichu Manushyan Thottu (1973) as Ramakrishnan
 Rakkuyil (1973)
 Preathangalude Thazhvaram (1973)
 Poymughangal (1973)
 Ponnapuram Kotta (1973)
 Police Ariyaruthe (1973)
 Pavangal Pennungal (1973)
 Panchavadi (1973) as Samson
 Padmavyooham (1973) as Pathrose
 Pacha Nottukal (1973) as Thommi Aashaan
 Nakhangal (1973)
 Masappady Mathupillai (1973)
 Manushya Puthran (1973)
 Manase (1973)
 Maram (1973) as Apputti
 Madhavikutty (1973)
 Ladies' Hostel (1973) as Bharathan
 Kavitha (1973)
 Kaliyugam (1973)
 Kaapalika (1973) as Pothachan/Peter
 Kaalachakram (1973) as Kochukuttan
 Ithu Manushiano? (1973)
 Interview  (1973) as Velu Pilla
 Football Champion (1973) as K. B. K. Nair
 Enippadikal (1973)
 Divyadharsanam (1973) as Kolappan
 Dhriksakshi (1973)
 Dharmayudham (1973) as Godhavarma Thampuran
 Darshanam (1973)
 Chukku (1973)
 Chenda (1973)
 Chaayam (1973)
 Bhadradeepam (1973) as Devarajan Potti/Unni Swami(double role)
 Angathattu (1973)
 Ajnathavasam (1973) as Minnal
 Achani (1973) as Kaimal
 Aaradhika (1973) as Seitu
 Uttarayanam (1974)
 Thumbolarcha (1974) as Bidananthan
 Thacholi Marumakan Chandu (1974) as Kandacheri Chappan
 Swarna Vigraham (1974)
 Suprabhatham (1974)
 Shapa Moksham (1974)
 Sethu Bandhanam (1974)
 Saptha Swarangal (1974) as Prathapan
 Rehasya Rathri (1974)
 Rajhamsam (1974)
 Poonthenaruvi (1974) as Ummachan
 Pattabhishekam (1974) as Bhasi
 Pancha Thanthram (1974) as Krishnankutty
 Oru Pidi Ari (1974)
 Night Duty (1974) as Padmanabha Panikkar
 Nellu (1974) as Nanu
 Neela Kannukal (1974)
 Nathoon (1974)
 Nagaram Sagaram (1974)
 Nadee Nadanmare Aavashyamunde (1974)
 Manyasree Viswamithran (1974) as Sankaran
 Durga (1974)
 College Girl (1974) as Suku
 Check Post (1974)
 Chattakkari (1974) as Morris
 Chandrakantham (1974)
 Chanchala (1974)
 Chakravakam (1974) as Sankaran
 Bhoomi Devi Pushpiniyayi (1974) as Sankara Menon
 Ayalathe Sundari (1974) as Gopal/Palgo 
 Aswathy (1974)
 Arakkallan Mukkalkkallan (1974)
 Alakal (1974)
 Velicham Akale (1975)
 Ullasa Yaathra (1975)
 Tourist Bungalow (1975)
 Thmamara Thoni (1975)
 Thiruvonam (1975)
 Swarna Matsyam (1975)
Chattambikkalyaani (1975) as Shareeram Kuttappan
 Soorya Vamsam (1975)
 Sammanam (1975)
 Raagam (1975)
 Sindhu (1975) as Venu
 Pravaham (1975) as Chandran
 Picnic (1975) as A. B. Menon
 Pennpada (1975) as Bhaskara Pillai
 Palaazhi Madhanam (1975)
 Padmaragam (1975)
 Oomana Kunju (1975)
 Neela Ponman (1975) as Kutty
 Mucheettu Kalikarante Magal (1975)
 Mattoru Seetha (1975)
 Manishada (1975)
 Makkal (1975)
 Madhura Padhinezhu (1975)
 Love Marriage (1975) as Menon
 Love Letter (1975)
 Kuttichaathan (1975)
 Kottaram Vilakkanundu (1975)
 Kalayana Sougandhikam (1975)
 Hello Darling (1975) as Padmarajan
 Dharmakshetre Kurukshetre (1975)
 Criminals (1975)
 Chuvanna Sandhyakal (1975)
 Chumadu Thangai (1975)
 Chief Guest (1975)
 Cheenavala (1975) as Pappo
 Boy Friend (1975/I)
 Babu Mon (1975) as Balagopal
 Alibaba and Forty-one Thieves (1975) as Kasim
 Abhimanam (1975)
 Ayodhya (1975) as M. K. Muthalali
 Aaranya Kaandum (1975)
 Yudha Bhoomi (1976)
 Yaksha Gaanam (1976) as P. K. Panikkar
 Vazhi Vilakku (1976)
 Vanadevatha (1976) as Kunju
 Sex Illa Stund Illa (1976)
 Seemantha Puthran (1976)
 Rathriyile Yathrakkar (1976)
 Rajayogam (1976)
 Pushpa Sarem (1976)
 Preeyamvadha (1976)
 Prasadam (1976) as Dr. Chandran
 Ponn (1976)
 Pick Pocket (1976)
 Panchami (1976) as Gangan
 Paarijatham (1976)
 Ozhukkinethire (1976)
 Neeyente Lahari (1976)
 Neela Sari (1976)
 Muthu (1976)
 Mohiniyattom (1976)
 Manasa Veena (1976)
 Mailanum Mathevanum (1976)
 Light House (1976) as Chandu
 Kayamkulam Kochunniyude Maghan (1976)
 Kanyadanam (1976)
 Kamadhenu (1976) as Sreekumaran
 Dweep (1976)
 Chottanikkara Amma (1976)
 Chennai Valarthiya Kutty (1976)
 Ayalkari (1976) as Fernandez
 Appooppan (1976)
 Anubhavam (1976)
 Amrudha Vahini (1976) as Vinod
 Ammini Ammavan (1976)
 Amma (1976)
 Ajayanum Vijayanum (1976)
 Abhinandanam (1976)
 Vyamoham (1977)
 Yatheem (1977) as Musaliyar
 Vishukkani (1977)
 Veedue Oru Swargam (1977)
 Varadhakshina (1977)
 Thuruppu Gulam (1977)
 Tholkkan Enikku Manassilla (1977)
 Sujatha (1977)
 Soorya Kanthi (1977)
 Sneham (1977)
 Shukradasha (1977)
 Satyavan Savithri (1977)
 Samudram (1977) as Easwara Pilla
 Rathi Manmathan (1977)
 Randu Lokam (1977) as Keshava Kurup
 Parivarthanam (1977)
 Panchamrutham (1977)
 Nurayum Pathayum (1977)
 Nirakudam (1977)
 Nalumani Pookkal (1977)
 Muttathe Mulla (1977) as Kochappan
 Mohavum Mukthiyum (1977)
 Mini Mol (1977)
 Makam Piranna Manka (1977)
 Lakshmi (1977)
 Kannappanunni (1977) as Thankakudam
 Kaduvaye Pidicha Kiduva (1977)
 Itha Ivide Vare (1977) as Nanu
 Guruvayoor Kesavan (1977)
 Chathur Vedam (1977)
 Chakravarthini (1977)
 Bharya Vijayam (1977)
 Aparaajitha (1977)
 Anjali (1977)
 Ammayi Amma (1977)
 Akshaya Paathram (1977)
 Akale Aakasam (1977)
 Adyapadam (1977)
 Acharam Ammini Osaram Omana (1977) as Inchakattil Kittu Pillai
 Yagaswam (1978)
 Vadakakkoru Hridhyam (1978)
 Theerangal (1978)
 Thamburatti (1978) as Thampuran
 Snehathinte Mukhangal (1978)
 Sathru Samharam (1978)
 Reghu Vamsam (1978)
 Rathi Nirvedham (1978)
 Ona Pudava (1978)
 Nivedhyam (1978) as Kamsan Panikkar
 Nakshathrangale Kaaval (1978)
 Mattoru Karnan (1978)
 Mannu (1978)
 Madanolsavam (1978) as Frederick March
 Kudumbam Namakku Sreekovil (1978) as Sukumaran
 Kanal Kattakal (1978) as Arjunan
 Kalpa Vriksham (1978) as Judo/Ajayan
 Kadathanattu Maakkam (1978)
 Jayikkanaayi Janichavan (1978)
 Jala Tharangam (1978)
 Itha Oru Manushyan (1978) as Padmanabha Kurup
 Gaandharvam (1978)
 Ee Ganam Marakkumo (1978)
 Bharyayum Kamukiyum (1978)
 Bandhanam (1978)
 Balapareekshanam (1978)
 Aval Vishwastha Aayirunnu (1978) as Avarachan
 Ashoka Vanam (1978)
 Anubhoothikalude Nimisham (1978)
 Adimakachavadam (1978)
 Aarum Anyaralla (1978) as Vareed
 Aana Paachan (1978)
 Ward No. 7 (1979)
 Vellayani Paramu (1979) as Abdu
 Thuramugham (1979)
 Rakthamillatha Manushyan (1979) as Ramalinga Chettiyar
 Prabhu (1979) as Siddhan
 Allauddinum Albhutha Vilakkum (1979) as Muhammed Hussain
 Manushiyan (1979)
 Koumara Praayam (1979)
 Kathir Mandapam (1979)
 Cheriyachante Kroora Krithyangal (1979)... Cheriyachan
 Rajaneegandhi (1980) as Krishna Menon
 Naayattu (1980)
 Meen (1980)
 Karimpana (1980) as Sayippu
 Kalika (1980) as Vasu
 Ethikkara Pakky (1980) as Supramuthayyan
 Digvijayam (1980) as Kannappan
 Anthappuram (1980)
 Ammayum Makkalum (1980)
 Aagamanam (1980) as Samuel
 Theekkali (1981) as Bahuleyan
 Thakilu Kottampuram (1981) as Kunjunni Kurup
 Saahasam (1981)
 Paathira Sooryan (1981) as Pappachan
 Kodumudikal (1981) as Vasukuttan Pilla
 Kallan Pavithran (1981) as Merchant/Trader
 Irattimadhuram (1981)
 Ellaam Ninakku Vendi (1981) as Panikkar
 Munnettam (1981) as Gopalan Nair
 Kadathu (1981) as School Principal
 Vidhichathum Kothichathum (1982)
 Snehapoorvam Meera (1982) as Panikkar
 Oru Kunju Janikkunnu (1982)
 Ormakkayi (1982)
 Olangal (1982)
 Naagamadhathu Thampuratti (1982)
 Mayilanji (1982) as Hameed Sayivu
 Mathruka Kudumbam (1982)
 Koaritharicha Naal (1982)
 Keni (1982)
 Aasha  (1982)... Willy
 Kattile Pattu (1982) as Raghavan Pilla
 Jumbulingam (1982)
 Ilakkangal (1982)
 Irattimadhuram (1982) as Thorappan Panikkar
 Gaanam (1982)
 Ente Mohangal Poovaninju (1982) as Easwaran
 Enikkum Oru Divasam (1982) as Ouseph
 Chiriyo Chiri (1982)
 Chillu (1982) as Annie's father
 Sandhya Vandanam (1983)
 Sandhyakku Virinja Poovu (1983)
 Rugma (1983) as Bhatt
 Pinnilavu (1983) as Padmanabha Pillai
 Oomai Kuyil (1983)
 Onnu Chirikku (1983) as Krishnan Nair
 Nanayam (1983)
 Maniyara (1983)
 Mahabali (1983)
 Kuyiline Thedi (1983) as Ganapathi Iyer
 Justice Raja (1983)
 Iniyenkilum (1983) as Parakkal Mathai
 Himavahini (1983) as Watcher
 Guru Dakshina (1983)
 Ente Katha (1983) as Govinda Kuruppu
 Engane Nee Marakkum (1983)
 Belt Mathai (1983) as Pokker
 Ashtapadi (1983)
 Adhyathe Anuragam (1983)
 Aadhipathyam (1983) as Sankara Pilla
 Aaroodam (1983)
 Vetta (1984)
 Vepraalam (1984)
 Vellam (1984) as Kunjunni
 Kilikkonchal(1984) as Menon
 Thathamme Poocha Poocha (1984) as Gonsalves
 Swanthamevide Bandhamevide (1984) as Bhaskara Menon
 Pavam Poornima (1984) as Chellappan Pilla
 Onnanu Nammal (1984) as Padmanabhan Nair
 Muthodu Muthu (1984) as Prabhakaran Pillai
 Manithali (1984) as Abdullakunjikka
 Lakshmana Rekha (1984)
 Koottinilamkili (1984) as Valiya Kurup
 Jeevitham (1984)
 Itha Innu Muthal (1984)
 Ethirppukal (1984)
 Ente Kalithozhan (1984)
 Eenum (1984)
 Edavelakku Sesham (1984)
 Swantham Sarika (1984) as Krishnan Nair 
 Athirathram (1984) as Lona
 18 April (1984) as Policeman's father-in-law
 Aalkkoottathil Thaniye (1984) as Achuthan 
 Principal Olivil (1985)
 Pacha Velicham (1985) as Mohammed
 Orikkal Oridathu (1985)
 Neerariyum Nerathu (1985)
 Mulamoottil Adima (1985) as Shivaswami
 Madhu Vidhurathri (1985)
 Kilippattu (1985)
 Aanakkorumma (1985) as Raman Nair
 Ee Thanalil Ithiri Neram (1985)
 Avidathepole Ivideyum (1985)
 Eeran Sandhya (1985)
 Manya Mahajanangale (1985)
 Angadikkappurathu (1985) as Lazar
 Yathra (1985) as Priest
 Vaiki Odunna Varathi (1986)
 Rajavinte Makan (1986) as Priest
 Iniyum Kurukshethram (1986) as Govinda Pillai
 Kaveri (1986) as Raman Nair
 Adukkan Entheluppam (1986) as San Diego
 Nandi Veendum Varika (1986) as Vishnu Nampoothiri
 Padayani (1986)
 Rakkuyilin Rajassadasil (1986)
 Kochu Themmadi (1986)
 Sarvakalashala (1987) as College Principal
 Irupatham Noottandu (1987)
 Purushartham (1987)
 Bhoomiyile Rajakkanmar (1987) as Thekkumkoor Valiya Thampuran
 Kalam Mari Katha Mari (1987) as Musthafa
 Idanazhiyil Oru Kaalocha (1987)
 Ivide Ellavarkkum Sukham (1987) as Thampuran
 Manivatharile Aayiram Sivarathrikal (1987) as Neena's uncle
 Rahasyam Parama Rahasyam (1988) as Chathunni
 Evidence (1988)
 Chakkikotha Chankaran (1989) as Madhava Menon
 Ragam Anuragam (1990) as Xavier

As director
 Reghu Vamsam (1978)
 Acharam Ammini Osaram Omana (1977)
 Aadhya Paadam (1977)

As playback singer
 "Kaduva..." - Maravil Tirivu Sookshikkuka
 "Oru Roopa Nottu Koduthal..." - Lottery Ticket (1970)
 "Thallu Thallu..." - Abhijatyam
  "Thalassery..." - Kannur Deluxe
  "Kuruvi petti", "Vottilla Vottilla..." - Sthanarthi Saramma
  "Velutha Vavinum..." with K. J. Yesudas and P. Suseela - Chakravakam
  "Neeya Saranam..." - Thekkan Kattu
  "Manyanmare..." - Sakthi
  "Pankaja Dala Nayane...", "Irattathookkam..." - Kattukurangu
 "Anachal Chanda..." - Adya Kiranam 
 "Kallupaalathil Kariyaachan..." - Aadyakiranangal (1964)
 "Manjulabhaashini Baale..." - Aadyakiranangal (1964)
 "Kannoor Dharmadam..." - Aadyakiranangal (1964)
 "Shanka Vittu Varunnallo..." - Aadyakiranangal (1964)
 "Car Lorreel Keri..." - Aadyakiranangal (1964)
 "Zindabaad Zindabaad..." - Sthaanaarthi Saramma (1966)
 "Kaduvappetti..." - Sthaanaarthi Saramma (1966)
 "Utharamadhuraapuri..." - Kaattukurangu (1969)
 "Kallukulangare..." - Kaattukurangu (1969)
 "Shyaamalam Graamaranga..." - Kaattukurangu (1969)
 "Chinchilam Chiluchilam..." - Vidyarthikale Ithile Ithile (1972)
 "Oshaakali..." - Chaayam (1973)
 "Velutha Vavinum..." - Chakravaakam (1974)
 "Naanam Maraykkaan..." - Swarnnavigraham (1974)
 "Angaadi Marunnukal..." - Amrithavaahini (1976)
 "Chora Thilaykkum Kaalam..." - Raghuvamsham (1978)
 "Kokkarakko Paadum..." - Onappudava (1978)
 "Ikkaanunna Kettitadhil" [Bit]... - Thuramukham (1979)
 "Enaakshiyaarival" [Bit]... - Thuramukham (1979)

Lyrics
 "Angaadi Marunnukal..." Amrithavaahini (1976)

References

External links
 https://web.archive.org/web/20160304042955/http://en.msidb.org/displayProfile.php?category=actors&artist=Adoor%20Bhasi&limit=536
 

Kerala State Film Award winners
Indian male film actors
Male actors from Thiruvananthapuram
1927 births
1990 deaths
Male actors in Malayalam cinema
Filmfare Awards South winners
Malayalam film directors
20th-century Indian male actors
Film directors from Thiruvananthapuram
20th-century Indian film directors
Indian male playback singers
Malayalam playback singers
Singers from Thiruvananthapuram
20th-century Indian singers
20th-century Indian male singers
Malayalam comedians